The Republic of Poland Ambassador to Ukraine is the leader of the Poland delegation, Poland Mission to Ukraine. Poland Ambassador to Ukraine is the official representative of the President and Government of Poland to the President and Government of Ukraine.

As with all Poland Ambassadors, the ambassador to Ukraine is nominated by the President of Poland and confirmed by the Parliamentary Commission of the Foreign Affairs. The ambassador serves at the pleasure of the president, and enjoys full diplomatic immunity.

The Embassy of Poland is located in Kyiv, in addition, there are Consulates General located in Lviv, Odessa, Kharkiv, Lutsk and Vinnytsia.

History 
Poland was the first country in the world which recognised Ukraine's independence in 1991. The history of ambassadors of Poland to Ukraine began in 1992, when both countries established diplomatic relations. Until 1991, the Ukrainian Soviet Socialist Republic had been a constituent SSR of the Soviet Union however during this period in Kiev was located Consulate General of Poland.

List of ambassadors of Poland to Ukraine 

 1992–1997: Jerzy Kozakiewicz
 1997–2001: Jerzy Bahr
 2001–2005: Marek Ziółkowski
 2005–2010: Jacek Kluczkowski
 2010–2011: Dariusz Górczyński, charge d'affaires
 2011–2016: Henryk Litwin
 2016–2019: Jan Piekło
 since 2019: Bartosz Cichocki

Gallery

References 

Ukraine
Poland